Ibolya Tilkovszky (born 11 January 1933) is a Hungarian sprinter. She competed in the women's 100 metres at the 1952 Summer Olympics.

References

External links
 

1933 births
Living people
Athletes (track and field) at the 1952 Summer Olympics
Hungarian female sprinters
Olympic athletes of Hungary
Athletes from Budapest
Olympic female sprinters